Billy Simpson (born 17 July 1987) is an Indonesian singer-songwriter, musician, producer and multi-instrumentalist. He is the winner of the first season of The Voice Indonesia.

Early life
Simpson was born in Jakarta on 17 July 1987 to parents who have neither the interest nor background in music that throughout his childhood years, his exposure to music was thus relatively limited.  In fact, the closest exposure to music that he had as a child was obtained from watching Disney movies.

Being encouraged by his sister, Simpson's first ‘official’ encounter with music occurred as he began playing bass at a church at the age of 13. A few years later, he moved to Melbourne, Australia to pursue his collegiate studies. There he started to discover his love of singing through his involvement in various musical events organized by Indonesian students. Apart from his participation in musicals, Simpson also acted in Kado Kendo, a student-initiated movie filmed in Melbourne, Australia in 2007.

Career

Early years
After completing his studies in Business and Economics in Melbourne, Simpson returned to Indonesia. He was then asked to join and become one of the lead-vocalists of a band called VoZ for an album called Putus Cinta before the members dispersed and went on their separate ways.  He then carried on with his own music career, performing at weddings and a variety of events. Aside from those, Simpson wrote his own music, produce them in his own home-based music studio and create videos based on them. He also ran his home studio as a production house, regularly creating music for other singers, bands and corporations.

The Voice Indonesia
In February 2013, Simpson passed the Blind-Audition of The Voice Indonesia which is aired in Indosiar TV.  Singing the song One by U2 gave him a 4-chair-turn and he picked Giring Ganesha from the band Nidji as his coach.

In the Battle Rounds, Simpson performed "I Won’t Give Up" by Jason Mraz, competing against Andreas Galih.  After seeing the duet performance of both singers onstage, coach Giring finally chose Billy to carry on to the next round of the competition: the Top 24 LIVE show.

At the TOP 24, Simpson presented his own ‘twist’ of "Beautiful", a song originally performed by Cherrybelle, and managed to get to the next stage of the competition.

Fans from all over Indonesia started to follow Simpson and call themselves "Billyvers"

Today, Billy Simpson is the first winner of the show.

Discography

Album 
 2013: "Lukisanku" now available on iTunes.
 2013: "Christmas with Billy Simpson"

Lukisanku: Track listing

"Lukisanku" is the winning album from the winning of The Voice Indonesia (season 1) produced by Universal Music Group.

Singles 
 2010: "The Best Is What I Will Get"
 2013: "Jembatan Pengharapan" "Sabarlah"
2014: "Janjimu Itu"
 2014: "Storyline" 
 2016: "Envy You" 
 2017: "Sendiri" 
 2018: "I Need Love feat Rayi “RAN”" 
 2018: "Be My Wife"
 2018: "Connected to You"
 2019: "Mimpi Jadi Nyata" feat Angel Hoseani
 2020: "Lecture with Love"

Filmography
 2007: Kado Kendo - (Melbourne, Australia)

Advertisements & Endorsements
Bose Line-Array Product Launch and Press Conference at Harris Hotel, Jakarta on 26 February 2014 
HTC One
Billboard at ITC Roxy Mas, Soekarno Hatta Billboard and Wall Panels (May 2013 - April 2014)
Chevrolet Spin

Other Media Appearances
LIVE Recording Concert Jakarta Tabernacle Choir feat. Billy Simpson 25 September 2014 - Grace
Music Run Press Conference 4 September 2014 by Billy Simpson
Liputan6 - Simulasi PNS 19 August 2014 opening by Billy Simpson
Kuala Lumpur Lake Garden Festival 17 August 2014 - Tribute to victims of MH 17
TOP 50 CLEO Indonesia Bachelor 2014
Up Close and Personal with Billy Simpson at @America Pacific Place 11 July 2014
Liputan 6 LIVE EVENT QUICK COUNT PEMILU PILPRES 9 Juli 2014
Exclusive LIVE interview with Merry Mariana on Sonora FM 20 June 2014
Indonesia Morning Show on NET TV 12 June 2014
MostFM Interview Medan 30 May 2014
Press Conference launching of Janjimu Itu Video Clip at Grand Indonesia 8 May 2014
HardRock FM Bandung Anniversary Celebration with Billy Simpson 26 April 2014
NEW Famili 100 with Tukul ep 154 on Indosiar 22 April 2014
Paskah LIVE from Fatican on Indosiar with Billy Simpson 20 April 2014
MediaCorp Interview with Manja Magazine and Ria FM Singapore 31 March 2014
Sarah Sechan Show on NET TV 28 March 2014
Meet and Greet with Billyvers sponsored by Bakmi GM 4 March 2014
Opening Act for Michael Learns to Rock concert in Jakarta, Skeeno Hall Gandaria City 19 February 2014
LOVE CINTA with Radio OZ Bandung 31 January 2014
Putri Indonesia off-air Indosiar 29 January 2014
Chevrolet Spin 9-showroom Tour 25–26 January 2014
Star Radio Padang Press Conference at G Sports Center Padang 27 January 2014
HUT 19 Indosiar Aksi Gemilang 11 January 2014
Harmoni 13 December 2013 at SCTV (Indonesia)
Festival Film Indonesia 7 December 2013 at SCTV (Indonesia)
Presenter of Yahoo! OMG Awards 2013 at Indosiar for 2 categories:
 Favorite New Comedian won by Raditya Dika
 Sexiest Dad won by Mike Lewis
Billy Simpson performing at Java Soulnation 6 October 2013 with Shane Filan a former lead singer of Westlife
Special Performance at Take Me Out Indonesia Season 4 Episode 73 aired 10 September 2013 at Indosiar
Featured artist of OMG Yahoo! Flickr Seleb
Gebyar BCA 29 June 2013 at Indosiar
SOS 21 June 2013 at ANTV
HTC One Product Launch
The Grand Opening of The Disco by Edward Suhadi
IPH School, Surabaya graduation

Awards and honors
 Winner of Season One The Voice Indonesia aired on Indosiar TV.  
 Artist of the Month by CDBS 94.5FM Radio Bali
 Featured Artist by Radio Nusantara Universitas
 World Wide Trending Topic in Twitter during the finals of The Voice Indonesia

Personal life
After returning from Australia, Simpson joined Jakarta Praise Community Church (JPCC).  A few years later, he started recording LIVE with JPCC Worship - True Worshippers as a singer and songwriter.  Also, he became the frontman of True Worshipper Youth.

Simpson is active on Social Media and could be found on Flickr, Twitter, Instagram, Facebook, etc. for updates. Simpson's website is: www.billysimpsonmusic.com. On 3 October this year, Billy Simpson is the worship leader on a Live JPCC Concert at the KDCA Kota Kinabalu.

On 24 November 2018, he was married to Sally Santoso.

References

1987 births
21st-century Indonesian male singers
Indonesian songwriters
Indonesian people of Chinese descent
Living people
Multi-instrumentalists
The Voice (franchise) winners
Singers from Jakarta